Ericka Huggins ( Jenkins; born January 5, 1948) is an American activist, writer, and educator. She is a former leading member of the political organization, Black Panther Party (BPP). She was married to fellow BPP member John Huggins in 1968. In 1969, as part of the New Haven Black Panther trials, Huggins was charged with various crimes relating to the murder of Alex Rackley. She was found not guilty on all charges and released from prison in 1971.

Early life and education 
Born Ericka Jenkins in Washington, D.C., Huggins was the middle child of three. After graduating high school in 1966, Huggins attended Cheyney State College (now Cheyney University of Pennsylvania). She then attended Lincoln University, an historically black school  in Philadelphia, Pennsylvania. There she studied education, and eventually met John Huggins, who she would later marry in 1968. Although Lincoln University’s Black Student Congress was opposed to female leaders, Huggins engaged in the group despite the opposition.

She holds a Master of Arts in Sociology from California State University, East Bay. Her thesis focused on an education model which proposed “student-centered, community-based tuition-free education for students to minimize the multigenerational race and gender trauma of American”

Career 
In 1972, she moved to California and became an elected member of the Berkeley Community Development Council. Later, in 1976, she was elected onto the Alameda County Board of Education. She was both the first Black person, as well as the first Black woman to have a seat on the Board. From 2008 to 2015, Huggins worked in the Peralta Community College District as a professor of sociology, African American studies, and women studies. She taught sociology at both Laney College and at Berkeley City College, as well as women’s studies at California State University. In addition, for more than 30 years, she has lectured at Stanford University, Cornell University, and University of California, Los Angeles where she has spoke about education, spirituality, feminism, prison reform, and queer people of color homelessness.

In relation to her work with spirituality, Huggins did work for 15 years at the Siddha Yoga Prison Project where she led hatha yoga and meditation to groups such as incarcerated people, public school children, and college students. At the Mind/Body Medical Institute, which works with Harvard medical school, she continued sharing her spirituality and its practices for 5 years.

Involvement with the Black Panther Party 
While at Lincoln University, Both Ericka and her husband were inspired to leave school, and join the Black Panther Party. Her motivation came from a Ramparts magazine article she read that discussed the cruel treatment of Huey P. Newton while incarcerated. A picture in the article depicted Newton shirtless, with a bullet wound in his stomach, strapped to a hospital gurney. In 1967, the couple arrived in Los Angeles and joined the Black Panther Party.

Eventually, her husband John Huggins, became leader of the Los Angeles Chapter of the Black Panther Party. While at home with her three week old daughter, her husband was assassinated on January 17, 1969, on the UCLA campus due to a feud between the Black Panther Party and a Black Nationalist group, US Organization, that was fueled by the FBI's COINTELPRO program. After his death, Ericka attended his burial in his birthplace of New Haven, Connecticut. Following his funeral, she decided to move there and open up a new Black Panther Party branch. She led this new chapter along two other women, Kathleen Neal Cleaver and Elaine Brown.

While involved with the Black Panthers, Huggins held several positions: both an editor and writer for the Black Panther Intercommunal News Service, director of the party’s Oakland Community School from 1973 to 1981, and a member of the party’s Central Committee. After spending two years in prison, Huggins decided to leave the Black Panthers, after being a member for 14 years, which is the longest membership for any woman involved with it.

New Haven Black Panther trials 

In 1969, members of the New Haven Black Panthers tortured and murdered Alex Rackley, whom they suspected of being an informant. Along with Black Panther Party co-founder Bobby Seale, Huggins was charged with murder, kidnapping, and conspiracy.  Huggins was heard speaking on a tape recording of Rackley's interrogation that was played during the trial. The trial sparked protests across the country about whether the Panthers would receive a fair trial and the jury selection would become the longest in state history. In May 1971 the jury deadlocked 10 to 2 for Huggins' acquittal, and she was not retried.

Writing and poetry 
While awaiting trial from 1969 to 1972, Huggins spent her time writing in the Prison Niantic State Farm for Women. Writing about the poor social conditions herself and her community endured, she viewed storytelling as a form of self-defense, personal agency, and educational activism. Her work is defined by themes such as love and hate, time and space, sexism and feminism, spirituality, racism, and nationalism. After being released from prison and all charges being requited, Insights and Poems, a book of poetry, co written by Huggins and Huey P. Newton, founder of the Black Panther Party, was released in 1975.

Personal life 
Ericka Huggins married John Huggins in 1968. Ericka gave birth to their daughter, Mai Huggins, at the age of 20. Within three months of their daughter's birth, Ericka became a widow when John Huggins was killed on the UCLA campus in January 1969.

Huggins has two sons. One of her sons is Rasa Sun Mott, whom she had with James Mott, lead singer of the Lumpen, the Black Panthers singing group. Huggins has been with her now partner, Lisbet Tellefsen, who is an archivist, collector, and curator for 16 years.

Bibliography

References

External links 

 Official website
 Ericka C. Huggins oral history interview conducted by David P. Cline in Oakland, California, 2016 June 30, from Library of Congress
 Young Lords in Lincoln Park

Members of the Black Panther Party
Activists for African-American civil rights
African-American activists
Activists from the San Francisco Bay Area
People from Berkeley, California
American sociologists
American women sociologists
African-American social scientists
Living people
1948 births
People from Oakland, California
20th-century American women
21st-century American women